This is a list of public art in Mayfair, a district in the City of Westminster, London.

Mayfair is a residential and commercial area dominated by terraces of town houses. In Grosvenor Square there are several memorials with an American theme, including a memorial garden commemorating the September 11 attacks, due to the former presence on that square of the US Embassy. At the southern end of the district, the courtyard of Burlington House (home of the Royal Academy of Arts) on Piccadilly is frequently used as a temporary exhibition space for artworks.



Burlington House

Sydney Smirke's remodelling of Burlington House for the Royal Academy of Arts in 1872–1873 included adding an additional storey to house the Diploma Galleries; the resulting windowless exterior was adorned with statues of artists in niches. A freestanding statue by Alfred Drury of Joshua Reynolds, the Academy's founding president, was installed at the centre of the courtyard in 1931. In 2002 the courtyard was refurbished to a design by Michael Hopkins, after the Academy received a donation from Walter and Leonore Annenberg. At the suggestion of the architect Ian Ritchie, the lights and fountains set into the pavement were arranged in the position of the planets, the Moon and some of the bright stars as they would have appeared over London on the night of Reynolds's birth. The courtyard is used as an exhibition space for temporary artworks.

6 Burlington Gardens

6 Burlington Gardens, a Grade II* listed building now used by the Royal Academy, was designed by James Pennethorne in 1866–1867 for the University of London. In 1868 the university's Senate proposed the subjects of the 22 statues for the façade: Isaac Newton to represent Science, Jeremy Bentham for Law, John Milton for the Arts and William Harvey for Medicine; Galen, Cicero, Aristotle, Plato, Archimedes and Tribonian (the last of whom was replaced in the final scheme by Justinian) as representatives of "ancient culture", and the "illustrious foreigners" Gottfried Wilhelm Leibniz, Georges Cuvier, Carl Linnaeus, Galileo Galilei, Johann Wolfgang von Goethe and Pierre-Simon Laplace. Finally, Adam Smith, John Locke, Francis Bacon, John Hunter, William Shakespeare (replaced by David Hume) and John Dalton (replaced by Humphry Davy) were included as "English worthies" (although Smith, Hunter and Hume were Scottish). Shakespeare was substituted as his achievement was felt to be "independent of academic influence"; he was instead commemorated with a statue apart, inside the building.

References

Bibliography

 

 

 

Mayfair
 Public art